Enville is a civil parish in the district of South Staffordshire, Staffordshire, England. It contains 44 listed buildings that are recorded in the National Heritage List for England. Of these, three are at Grade II*, the middle of the three grades, and the others are at Grade II, the lowest grade. The parish contains the village of Enville and the surrounding countryside. In the parish is Enville Hall, a country house, which is listed together with associated structures and buildings in its grounds. Most of the other listed buildings are houses and associated structures, cottages, farmhouses and farm buildings, the earlier of which are timber framed or have a timber framed core. The rest of the listed buildings include a church, items in the churchyard, a model farm, a watermill, a former smithy, two mileposts, and a telephone kiosk.


Key

Buildings

References

Citations

Sources

Lists of listed buildings in Staffordshire
South Staffordshire District